Sandra Narelle Smith, OAM (born 23 May 1968) is an Australian Paralympic tandem cycling pilot.

She was born on 23 May 1968 in Merredin, Western Australia. She won two gold medals at the 1996 Atlanta Games in the Women's Individual Pursuit Tandem open and Women's Kilo Tandem open events with Teresa Poole, for which she received a Medal of the Order of Australia. In 2000, she received an Australian Sports Medal.

References

Paralympic cyclists of Australia
Cyclists at the 1996 Summer Paralympics
Paralympic gold medalists for Australia
Paralympic sighted guides
Recipients of the Medal of the Order of Australia
Recipients of the Australian Sports Medal
Living people
1968 births
Medalists at the 1996 Summer Paralympics
Australian female cyclists
Paralympic medalists in cycling